Interpenetration may refer to:

 Interpenetration (Buddhism), a concept of Buddhist philosophy
 Interpenetration (Christianity), a term in Christian theology
 Interpenetration, in computer 3D modelling collision detection

See also
 Impenetrability, that quality of matter whereby two bodies cannot occupy the same space at the same time
Penetration (disambiguation)